The Royal Pigeon Racing Association (RPRA) is a governing body for pigeon racing in the United Kingdom. Queen Elizabeth II was president of the RPRA and also an enthusiastic pigeon fancier herself. The RPRA has 21,000 members spread across 1,500 pigeon clubs in the UK. The association performs charity work and raises approximately £100,000 for charitable causes each year.

References

External links
 Royal Pigeon Racing Association Official website

Domestic pigeons
Pigeon racing
Hobbyist organizations
1896 establishments in the United Kingdom
Sports organizations established in 1896
Organisations based in the United Kingdom with royal patronage
Sports governing bodies in the United Kingdom